All True Man is the fourth studio album by American recording artist Alexander O'Neal. The album was a success in the UK, peaking at number two, though sales did not reach the levels of his previous album, Hearsay.

On release, the album was received favorably by the majority of music critics. it went on to peak at number 49 on the Billboard 200 and reached #3 on Top R&B/Hip-Hop Albums. The album's title single reached number 5 on the R&B chart and number 43 on the pop chart. The album launched four charting singles in the UK. "All True Man" peaked at number 18 on the UK Singles Chart; "What Is This Thing Called Love?" peaked at #53; "Shame on Me" peaked at number 71; "Sentimental" at number 53. The album was certified gold by the RIAA in 1992. In the UK, it was also certified gold by the BPI.

Critical reception
In a retrospective review, Alex Henderson of AllMusic gave the album three out of five stars and wrote that "The production is slick and high-tech; the vocals are the essence of earthy soulfulness. All True Man isn't O'Neal's best or most essential Tabu/Epic release; novices, in fact, would be better off starting out with his self-titled debut album of 1985." adding that "Nonetheless, this is a respectable, satisfying effort that the singer's hardcore fans will appreciate."

Track listing

Personnel
Credits are adapted from the album's liner notes.

 "Time Is Running Out"
 Jimmy Jam - keyboards, synthesizer, drum programming, rhythm & vocal arrangements  
 Terry Lewis - rhythm & vocal arrangements, backing vocals
 Lisa Keith - backing vocals

 "The Yoke (G.U.O.T.R.)"
 Jimmy Jam - keyboards, synthesizer, drum programming, rhythm & vocal arrangements  
 Terry Lewis - rhythm & vocal arrangements, backing vocals
 prof t. - rap, backing vocals
 Lisa Keith - backing vocals 
 Joey Elias - backing vocals

 "Every Time I Get Up"
 Lance Alexander - drum programming, sampling, keyboards, piano, rhythm & vocal arrangements, programming vocals, programming, sequencing, additional vocals
 prof. T. - vocal arrangements, backing vocals
 Terry Lewis - vocal arrangements, programming vocals, backing vocals, additional vocals
 Karyn White - backing vocals
 Andre Shepard - backing vocals
 Ann Nesby - backing vocals
 Marie Graham - backing vocals

 "Somebody (Changed Your Mind)"
 Jimmy Jam - keyboards, synthesizer, drum programming, rhythm & vocal arrangements
 Terry Lewis - rhythm & vocal arrangements, backing vocals
 Karyn White - backing vocals
 Andre Shepard - backing vocals

 "Midnight Run"
 Denzil Foster - keyboards, drum programming
 Thomas Elroy - keyboards, drum programming
 Maxine Jones - backing vocals
 Samuelle - backing vocals

 "Used"
 Jellybean Johnson - all guitars, drums, synthesizer, rhythm & vocal arrangements
 Chance Howard - keyboards, synthesizer
 Jimmy Jam - keyboards
 Jim Demgen - computer programming
 Lisa Keith - vocal arrangements, backing vocals
 prof. t. - backing vocals

 "All True Man"
 Jimmy Jam - keyboards, synthesizer, drum programming, rhythm & vocal arrangements
 Terry Lewis - percussion, rhythm & vocal arrangements, backing vocals
 Karyn White - backing vocals

 "Sentimental"
 Jimmy Jam - acoustic piano, keyboards, synthesizer, drum programming, rhythm & vocal arrangements
 Terry Lewis - rhythm & vocal arrangements, backing vocals
 Lee Blaskey - string arrangements
 Susie Allard - strings
 Mynra Rian - strings
 Joanna Shelton - strings
 Carolyn Daws - strings
 Mary Bahr - strings
 Lea Foli - strings
 Julia Persilz - strings
 Hyacinthe Tlucek - strings
 Maricia Peck - strings
 Jeanne Ekhold - strings
 Luara Sewell - strings
 Rudolph Lekhter - strings
 Karyn White - backing vocals
 Lisa Keith - backing vocals

 "What Is This Thing Called Love?"
 Jimmy Jam - acoustic piano, keyboards, synthesizer, drum programming, rhythm & vocal arrangements
 Terry Lewis - rhythm & vocal arrangements, backing vocals
 Lee Blaskey - string arrangements
 Susie Allard - strings
 Mynra Rian - strings
 Joanna Shelton - strings
 Carolyn Daws - strings
 Mary Bahr - strings
 Lea Foli - strings
 Julia Persilz - strings
 Hyacinthe Tlucek - strings
 Maricia Peck - strings
 Jeanne Ekhold - strings
 Luara Sewell - strings
 Rudolph Lekhter - strings
 Lisa Keith - backing vocals

 "The Morning After"
 Jimmy Jam - keyboards, synthesizer, drum programming, rhythm & vocal arrangements
 Terry Lewis - rhythm & vocal arrangements
 Lisa Keith - backing vocals
 Troy Thomson - backing vocals

 "Hang On"
 Lance Alexander - keyboards, drum programming, persuasion, rhythm & vocal arrangements, programming vocals, programming & sequencing 
 Jesse Johnson - guitars
 Terry Lewis - programming vocals, programming & sequencing, backing vocals
 prof. t. - rhythm & vocal arrangements, programming vocals, programming & sequencing, backing vocals 
 Karyn White - backing vocals

 Shame On Me
 Chance Howard - keyboards
 Jimmy Jam - rhythm & vocal arrangements
 Terry Lewis - rhythm & vocal arrangements

Charts

Weekly charts

Year-end charts

Certifications

References

External links

Alexander O'Neal albums
1991 albums
Tabu Records albums
Albums produced by Jimmy Jam and Terry Lewis